Aarong is a chain of Bangladeshi department stores specializing in Bengali ethnic wear and handicrafts. It is owned by the non-profit development agency BRAC, and employs thousands of rural artisans across the country. It currently operates twenty-one outlets in nine Bangladeshi metropolitan cities.

The organization was established in 1978. Aarong operates production units in rural and semi-urban areas as a part of its social enterprise model and provides the market linkage through its own retail outlets.

Allegations
Directorate of National Consumers Rights Protection (DNCRP) fined Tk4.5 lakh to Uttara outlet of Aarong and closed it for a day for selling same products in double price within a gap of five days. Following on a client's complaint that Aarong was selling a panjabi after nearly doubling its price, DNCRP officials visited the chain's flagship store on Jashimuddin Avenue at Uttara on 31 May 2019 and fined them after finding the allegation to be true. Monjur Mohammad Shahriar, deputy director of Directorate of National Consumers Rights Protection (DNCRP) led the drive but he was transferred later.

References

Retail companies of Bangladesh
Companies based in Dhaka
Organisations based in Motijheel
 Retail companies established in 1978
1978 establishments in Bangladesh
Bangladeshi brands
Clothing brands of Bangladesh